Mohammad Hadis Uddin (6 February 1949 – 7 August 2021) was a Bangladeshi police officer who served as the 23rd Inspector General of Police of Bangladesh Police in 2005. He was then transferred to the establishment ministry.

Career
Uddin was an officer of the police cadre service of 1973 batch. He served as deputy commander in the UN Mission in Cambodia in 1993 and minister in the Bangladesh High Commission in New Delhi from 1998 to 2003.

Uddin was the additional IGP (finance and development) at the police headquarters before being appointed the 23rd Inspector General of Police of Bangladesh Police.

Death
Uddin died from COVID-19 in August 2021.

References

1949 births
2021 deaths
Dhaka College alumni
University of Dhaka alumni
Inspectors General of Police (Bangladesh)
People from Khaliajuri Upazila
Deaths from the COVID-19 pandemic in Bangladesh